San Justo Department is a  department of Córdoba Province in Argentina.

The provincial subdivision has a population of about 190,182 inhabitants in an area of 13,677 km², and its capital city is San Francisco, which is located around 670 km from Buenos Aires. The department is home to Mar Chiquita, the largest inland body of water in Argentina.

Settlements

Alicia
Altos de Chipión
Arroyito
Balnearia
Brinkmann
Colonia Anita
Colonia Iturraspe
Colonia Las Pichanas
Colonia Marina
Colonia Prosperidad
Colonia San Bartolomé
Colonia San Pedro
Colonia Vignaud
Colonia Valtelina
Devoto
El Arañado
El Fortín
El Tío
Freyre
La Francia
La Paquita
La Tordilla
Las Varas
Las Varillas
Marull
Miramar
Morteros
Plaza Luxardo
Porteña
Quebracho Herrado
Sacanta
San Francisco
Saturnino María Laspiur
Seeber
Toro Pujio
Tránsito
Villa Concepción del Tío
Villa San Esteban

See also
San Justo Department (disambiguation)

External links

Departments of Córdoba Province, Argentina